In probability theory, the ladder height process is a record of the largest or smallest value a given stochastic process has achieved up to the specified point in time.

The Wiener-Hopf factorization gives the transition probability kernel in the discrete time case.

See also

 Record value

References

Queueing theory